John Speed (May 17, 1772 – March 30, 1840) was an American judge and farmer in Louisville, Kentucky. He built the Farmington estate and served briefly in the American Indian Wars.

Early life
John Speed was born on May 17, 1772, to Captain James Speed. He was ten years old when he came to Kentucky with his father. He received education from schools in Kentucky.

Career
Speed worked with his brother Thomas Speed in merchandising and making salt at the licks near Shepherdsville, Kentucky. In 1791, Speed served during the American Indian Wars under Brigadier General Charles Scott.

Speed was appointed as a judge of Quarter Sessions Court in Jefferson County, Kentucky. In 1828, he wrote a series of articles on political topics. They were published as a paper called The Focus and he signed himself as "Plain Farmer".

Personal life
Speed owned a large tract of land near Louisville called Beargrass. He started building a large house on this land called Farmington in early 1810. The main crop of the land was hemp. He was a slave owner, but it was noted in the autobiography of Reverend James Freeman Clark that he was against the institution of slavery.

By 1800, Speed married Abby Lemaster and they had four children, James, a second child named James, Mary and Eliza. Only Mary and Eliza survived infancy. They lived at Pond Creek in Jefferson County. Abby Lemaster died in July 1807. Speed married Lucy Gilmer Fry (1788–1874), daughter of Joshua and Peachy Fry, in 1808. They had eleven children: Thomas, Lucy Fry, James, Peachy Walker, Joshua Fry, William Pope, Susan Fry, Philip, John Smith, Martha Bell and Ann Pope.

Peachy Speed Peay's daughter Eliza married John Hardin Ward, who served in the American Civil War with the 27th Kentucky Volunteers. Lucy Fry Speed married James D. Breckinridge, a U.S. Representative from Kentucky. Philip Speed married Emma Keats, niece of John Keats. Joshua Fry Speed roomed with Abraham Lincoln in Springfield, Illinois and remained friends with Lincoln. James Speed became a lawyer and was appointed as U.S. Attorney General by President Lincoln. His grandson was James Breckenridge Speed, a businessman in Louisville. 

Speed died on March 30, 1840. He left Farmington and the land to Lucy Fry Speed. He was originally buried at the Farmington homestead, but his remains were moved to the Cave Hill Cemetery in Louisville.

References

External links

1772 births
1840 deaths
People from Louisville, Kentucky
County judges in Kentucky
Burials at Cave Hill Cemetery
American slave owners